The Delhi Defenders are a professional American football team based in Delhi, India. The Defenders are one of the first eight franchises of the Elite Football League of India (EFLI) and compete in its inaugural season in 2012 as a member of the East Division, where they finished as runners-up after a successful qualifying for the Elite Bowl I.

References

External links

Elite Football League of India
American football teams in India
American football teams established in 2011
Sports clubs in Delhi
2011 establishments in Delhi